Ptyomaxia syntaractis is a species of moth of the family Pyralidae. It is found in Australia, China and Taiwan.

References

Moths described in 1904
Phycitini